The Misfits is a 2021 American heist action film directed by Renny Harlin and written by Robert Henny and Kurt Wimmer. The film stars Pierce Brosnan, Rami Jaber, Hermione Corfield, Jamie Chung, Mike d Angelo, Tim Roth, Nick Cannon, and Qais Qandil. It was released in South Korea on June 3, 2021, and was released in the United States on June 11, 2021, by The Avenue Entertainment. The film was a box office disaster and received negative reviews.

Cast
 Pierce Brosnan as Richard Pace
 Rami Jaber as The Prince
 Hermione Corfield as Hope Pace
 Jamie Chung as Violet
 Pirat “Mike” Nitipaisalkul aka Mike Angelo as Wick
 Tim Roth as Schultz
 Nick Cannon as Ringo
 Qais Qandil as Jason Quick
 Samer al-Masry as Hassan (Shultz Thug 1)
 Mansoor Al Feeli as Abu Hirawa
 Walid Riachy

Production
According to Harlin, he and Brosnan had "been looking for a project to collaborate on for some time".

The project was first announced on February 12, 2019 at the Berlin International Film Festival's European Film Market. Filming locations include Abu Dhabi, Dubai and Los Angeles. Principal photography commenced a week later.

Release
The Misfits had its world premiere in South Korea on June 3, 2021. The Avenue Entertainment in association with Highland Film Group distributed the film on June 11, 2021.

Reception
On Rotten Tomatoes, the film has an approval score of 17% based on 26 reviews, with an average rating of 3.70/10. On Metacritic, the film has a score of 25 out of 100 based on 11 reviews, indicating "generally unfavorable reviews".

Accolades

Controversy
The film has been controversial in Qatar due to some real life negative references to Qatar to "terror" financing and explicit references to the Muslim Brotherhood as "terrorists" with Yusuf al-Qaradawi as their mastermind. The film is financed as well as co-produced by an Emirati production company, and given the involvement of Emirati media in propagating this narrative against Qatar at least since the first Qatar diplomatic crisis combined with Doha News reporting anti-Qatar plot elements in the film's content. Initially announced as "Coming Soon" in the Qatari subsidiary of Dubai-headquartered Vox Cinemas, the one half of film exhibition duopoly in Qatar, with the other half being Novo Cinemas which is also Dubai-headquartered but wholly owned indirectly by Doha-based Elan Group (through their ownership of its parent Gulf Film, a regional film distributor across West Asia and North Africa dealing mostly in foreign films, including but not limited to Hollywood releases) lending to this being the speculated factor behind them not picking this film up for exhibition not just in Qatar, but across all of the national markets they operated in, including UAE. As the backlash grew with leaked stills from South Korean release leading credence to discord over anti-Qatar "propaganda" embedded in the film, Emirati-owned Vox Cinemas ultimately shelved the film's planned release in Qatar, with press release confirming the move by 1 July 2021, the previously announced release date.

References

External links
 

2020s English-language films
2021 crime action films
2020s heist films
American crime action films
American heist films
Films directed by Renny Harlin
Films scored by Trevor Rabin
Films with screenplays by Kurt Wimmer
Films set in prison
Films set in Abu Dhabi
Films set in the Middle East
Films set in a fictional country
Films shot in Abu Dhabi
Films shot in Dubai
Films shot in Los Angeles
2020s American films